Kathy Hamstead is a former England women's international footballer.

Career

Hamstead began her career at 14 Kilnhurst Ladies and the made her England debut at 17. When Hamstead decided to go Loughborough University she ended to up playing for the university team.

References

People from Rotherham
Living people
English women's footballers
England women's international footballers
Alumni of Loughborough University
Year of birth missing (living people)
Women's association footballers not categorized by position